Dena Tauriello is a New Jersey-based drummer, educator, and author.

Early life
Tauriello grew up in Montville, New Jersey and attended Montville Township High School, where she played softball and earned 11 varsity letters.

After seeing Karen Carpenter play the drums during a live performance, she was able to meet with her. This meeting inspired her to begin playing drums. She took drum lessons as a child, and continued taking private lessons for 8 years.

Dena replaced Kristen Henderson (guitar/bass), who originally played drums in the band before taking up guitar. Dena was the only drummer to audition for the band in 1998, having less than 24 hours to prepare. She joined the band a short time after her audition.

Before Antigone Rising, Dena played drums in the all female cover band "Good Girl's Don't". GGD was a major attraction on the East Coast's cover band circuit drawing major crowds wherever they performed. They also opened for many signed artists like Korn and Fuel.

Dena was also one of the original members of New Jersey's pop/punk/rock band "From The Desk of Sally". While in FDOS, Dena recorded the band's first demo  and recorded all drum tracks for the band's first official release " Everything and Nothing". Dena departed before its release in 1999.

She lists The Carpenters, The Beatles and The Pretenders as some of her musical influences.

Antigone Rising

The band released four independent albums before they signed with a major label. Lava Records offered them a record deal in 2003, after Jasom Flom, the founder of Lava, saw one of their shows. Their major label debut From the Ground Up was released exclusively through Starbucks coffeeshops,  in conjunction with Starbucks' Hear Music series.

The band was recently released from its contract with Atlantic Records. They are now signed to Starbucks record label. They are currently recording their upcoming album tentatively scheduled for release in the summer of 2007.

Recognition
Dena is featured in the September 2018 issue of Modern Drummer magazine.

References

External links

Dena Tauriello's Official Website
Dena Tauriello's Feature in the September 2018 Issue of Modern Drummer
Official Website of Head Over Heels the Musical
 Antigone Rising

American rock drummers
American rock guitarists
Drew University alumni
Living people
Montville Township High School alumni
Musicians from New Jersey
People from Montville, New Jersey
Year of birth missing (living people)
American women guitarists
21st-century American women